Woking College is a sixth form college in Woking with over 1,400 16-19-year-olds studying A Levels and advanced vocational courses.

The college attracts students from over 50 schools. For students who need to top up their GCSE grades there are courses in English, maths and biology.

Facilities include a sports centre, gym and playing fields, a 140-seat theatre and dance studio, an arts block, and a science building.

References

External links
 Woking College website

Sixth form colleges in Surrey